The giant antpitta (Grallaria gigantea) is a perching bird species in the antpitta family (Grallariidae).

Rare and somewhat enigmatic, is known only from Colombia and Ecuador. It is presumably a close relative of the similar undulated antpitta, G. squamigera, which occurs to the south of G. gigantea. The giant antpitta has three subspecies, one of which might be extinct.

Description

G. gigantea is, as its name suggests, a huge antpitta. Its back, wings, and the stubby tail are dusky olive-brown. The top of the head is pale to medium grey, running down to the neck. The remaining plumage is deep rufous-brown. The throat and breast feathers are black-edged, resulting in a dark barring in these regions. The bill is dark, strong and heavy; the eyes are likewise dark, while the legs and feet are grey.

The song consists of low-pitched fast trills, about 14-21 notes per second. These are maintained several seconds, during which they rise in pitch and become louder. Trills are repeated after a pause of a few to about a dozen seconds, which varies irregularly throughout the length of the song. 

The undulated antpitta (G. squamigera) is a bit smaller, with a pale hue to the malar region and a yellower belly. Its song is hard to distinguish, but rather than simply breaking off after a time, it ends with some additional trills, separated by pauses of increasing length.

Ecology
In Colombia, historically the subspecies G. g. lehmanni inhabited both slopes of the Cordillera Central, where specimens were taken in Cauca and  Huila Departments before the mid-20th century, one (in 1941) in what today is Puracé National Natural Park. It has not definitely been relocated there, however. In 1988 and 1989, the species was recorded in La Planada Nature Reserve, Nariño Department, but the taxonomic identity of these birds requires verification.

In Ecuador, the nominate subspecies was formerly more widespread on the eastern slope of the Andes, but in recent times its presence is only confirmed in western Napo Province. Formerly, it was found (and may still be found in protected habitat) in eastern Carchi and Tungurahua Provinces. Subspecies hylodroma occurs on the west slope of the Andes in Pichincha and Cotopaxi Provinces. Two old specimens supposedly of hylodroma are from a site called "El Tambo" that has not been decisively relocated (but probably is in western Cañar Province) and Cerro Castillo in western Pichincha Province; the former is quite some distance away from the species' known range.

Its natural habitats are subtropical to temperate moist montane forests, with hylodroma recorded at 1,200-2,000 m ASL, gigantea from above 2,200 m ASL, and lehmanni from 3,000 m ASL. Occasionally, it frequents cloud forest swamps with abundant understory, pastures and secondary forest; overall however its survival seems to depend on primary forest.

Its food are largely terrestrial invertebrates, though arthropods are apparently not of key importance. Rather, the large Rhinodrilus earthworms may be a staple food. Beetle larvae and slugs have also been recorded as prey.

Little is known about its reproduction. In Pacha Quindi Nature Refuge and Botanical Gardens, an adult G. g. hylodroma was seen feeding a recently fledged young a large earthworm on April 19, 2001.

Status and conservation
With deforestation having claimed much suitable habitat already, the giant antpitta is classified as vulnerable species by the IUCN. Between 2000 and 2004, it had been uplisted to endangered status, as it was feared that habitat destruction was accelerating in the few areas where the birds were known to exist. This turned out less bad than assumed, and the species was downlisted again in 2004. Still, it considered threatened and is known in less than 10 locations (a total of 1,900 square kilometers), with habitat continuing to decline in quality and quantity and some subpopulations on the brink of complete extinction. Also, it is estimated to number less than 2,500 mature birds, with less than 1,000 in any one subpopulation.

The main threats are unsustainable logging, as well as land conversion for agriculture or narcotics plantations. Only in the range of the nominate subspecies does deforestation seem to have declined to levels where the species can be considered relatively secure; elsewhere, it is still extensive and may even threaten protected areas.

Puracé National Natural Park is the most likely site to hold any remaining population of G. g. lehmanni. The La Planada Nature Reserve subpopulation may have recently gone extinct; it was not found anymore in the 1990s. G. g. hylodroma is found in Mindo-Nambillo Protection Forest, Bosque Integral Otonga, Refugio Paz de Aves near Nanegalito, Pacha Quindi Nature Refuge and Botanical Gardens, and the Maquipucuna and Río Guajalito forest reserves. Around these protected areas, deforestation is severe however. The nominate subspecies occurs in the protected forests of Antisana Ecological Reserve and San Isidro Lodge.

Footnotes

References
 BirdLife International (BLI) [2009]: Giant Antpitta Species Factsheet. Retrieved November 9, 2009.
 Freile, Juan F. & Chaves,  Jaime A. (2004): Interesting distributional records and notes on the biology of bird species from a cloud forest reserve in north-west Ecuador. Bulletin of the British Ornithologists' Club 124 (1): 6–16. PDF fulltext 
 Greeney, Harold F. & Nunnery, Tony (2006): Notes on the breeding of north-west Ecuadorian birds. Bulletin of the British Ornithologists' Club 126 (1): 38–45. PDF fulltext 
 restedt, Martin; Fjeldså, Jon; Johansson, Ulf S. & Ericson, Per G. P. (2002): Systematic relationships and biogeography of the tracheophone suboscines (Aves: Passeriformes). Molecular Phylogenetics and Evolution 23 (3): 499–512. 
 Jones, Andy [2009]: Photostream Refugio Paz de Aves, near Nanegalito, Pichincha, Ecuador at Flickr. Retrieved November 9, 2009.
 Rice, Nathan H. (2005a): Phylogenetic relationships of antpitta genera (Passeriformes: Formicariidae). The Auk 122 (2): 673–683 [English with Spanish abstract].  PDF fulltext
 Rice, Nathan H. (2005b): Further Evidence for Paraphyly of the Formicariidae (Passeriformes). The Condor 107 (4): 910–915 [English with Spanish abstract].  PDF fulltext

External links

Giant antpitta videos at IBC.
Image at ADW

giant antpitta
giant antpitta
Birds of the Colombian Andes
Birds of the Ecuadorian Andes
giant antpitta
Taxonomy articles created by Polbot